
Year 409 BC was a year of the pre-Julian Roman calendar. At the time, it was known as the Year of the Consulship of Cossus and Medullinus (or, less frequently, year 345 Ab urbe condita). The denomination 409 BC for this year has been used since the early medieval period, when the Anno Domini calendar era became the prevalent method in Europe for naming years.

Events

By place

Greece 
 Alcibiades recaptures Byzantium, ending the city's rebellion from Athens. This action completes Athenian control of the Bosporus which secures the Athenian supply route for grain from the Bosporan Kingdom in the Black Sea region.
 The Athenian general, Thrasyllus, sails out from Athens with a sizable force to campaign in Ionia. There, he quickly captures Colophon and raids the Ionian countryside, but is defeated outside Ephesus by a combined Ephesian, Persian, and Syracusan force.
 Pausanias succeeds his father Pleistoanax as Agiad king of Sparta.
 The city of Rhodes is founded.

Sicily 
 Taking advantage of the quarrels between the Greek cities in Sicily and of the mutual exhaustion of Athens and Syracuse, Carthage seeks to reimpose its influence over the island. Hannibal Mago, grandson of Hamilcar, invades Sicily with a strong force. He defeats the Sicilian Greeks and avenges his grandfather through the torture and killing of 3,000 Greek prisoners. In the Battle of Selinus and Battle of Himera he captures and destroys both cities before returning triumphantly to Carthage with the spoils of war.

By topic

Literature 
 Sophocles' play Philoctetes is performed, with the theme of the Trojan War.
</onlyinclude>

Deaths 
 Pleistoanax, king of Sparta since 458 BC

References